Blaps is a genus of darkling beetles in the family Tenebrionidae. There are more than 30 described species in Blaps, the genus being most commonly found in Eurasia and Australia, with occasional sightings elsewhere in the world.

Species
These 38 species belong to the genus Blaps:

 Blaps abbreviata Menetries, 1836
 Blaps abdita Picka, 1978
 Blaps alternans Brulle, 1838
 Blaps bedeli Chatanay, 1914
 Blaps bipunctata Allard, 1880
 Blaps brevicornis Seidlitz, 1893
 Blaps foveicollis Allard, 1880
 Blaps gibba Laporte de Castelnau, 1840
 Blaps gigas (Linnaeus, 1767)
 Blaps graeca Solier, 1848
 Blaps halophila Fischer de Waldheim, 1820
 Blaps hispanica Solier, 1848
 Blaps holconota
 Blaps indagator Reiche, 1857
 Blaps kollari Seidlitz, 1893
 Blaps lethifera Marsham, 1802
 Blaps lusitanica Herbst, 1799
 Blaps milleri Seidlitz, 1893
 Blaps mortisaga (Linnaeus, 1758)
 Blaps mucronata Latreille, 1804 (cellar beetle)
 Blaps nitens Laporte de Castelnau, 1840
 Blaps ocreata Allard, 1880
 Blaps oertzeni Seidlitz, 1893
 Blaps orbicollis Motschulsky, 1845
 Blaps parvicollis Zoubkoff, 1829
 Blaps planicollis Motschulsky, 1845
 Blaps polychresta (Forskl, 1775)
 Blaps pruinosa Faldermann, 1833
 Blaps putrida Motschulsky, 1845
 Blaps robusta Motschulsky, 1845
 Blaps sinuaticollis Solier, 1848
 Blaps songorica Fischer de Waldheim, 1844
 Blaps splichali Gebien, 1913
 Blaps striola (Motschulsky, 1860)
 Blaps sulcata Laporte de Castelnau, 1840
 Blaps taeniolata Menetries, 1832
 Blaps tibialis Reiche, 1857
 Blaps waltli Seidlitz, 1893

References

Further reading

External links

 

Tenebrionoidea